Myopitini is a tribe of tephritid  or fruit flies in the family Tephritidae.

Genera
Asimoneura Czerny, 1909
Eurasimona Korneyev & White, 1991
Goedenia Freidberg & Norrbom, 1999
Inuromaesa Korneyev & White, 1991
Myopites Blot, 1827
Myopitora Korneyev & White, 1991
Neomyopites Korneyev & White, 1991
Rhynencina Johnson, 1922
Spinicosta Freidberg & Norrbom, 1999
Stamnophora Munro, 1955
Urophora Robineau-Desvoidy, 1830

References

Tephritinae
Diptera of Europe
Diptera of Asia
Diptera of Africa
Diptera of South America
Diptera of North America
Diptera tribes